Elizabeth Hughes  may refer to:

Elizabeth Hughes Gossett (1907–1981), née Elizabeth Hughes, early patient treated with insulin
Elizabeth Hughes (legislator)
Elizabeth Phillips Hughes (1851–1925), Welsh scholar, teacher, and promoter of women's education
Elizabeth Josephine Brawley Hughes (1839–1926), advocate of women's rights in the United States

See also